Archery at the 1976 Summer Paralympics consisted of eighteen events.

Medal table

Participating nations

Medal summary

Men's events

Women's events

References 

 

1976 Summer Paralympics events
1976
Paralympics